Amba Ghat  is a mountain pass on Ratnagiri-Kolhapur road (NH 204) in Maharashtra, India, at a height of 2000 ft above sea-level, This ghat lies in the Sahyadri mountain ranges (Western Ghats) and has picturesque mountain-scapes and a pleasant climate. It is situated near Shahuwadi, Kolhapur district, and has nearby interesting places are Pawankhind and Vishalgad fort . It is a convenient weekend destination for Kolhapur tourists.

The area has also become a venue for paragliding sport.

References

Pawankhind
Ambeshwar Temple

Mountain passes of Maharashtra
Mountain passes of the Western Ghats
Kolhapur district
Paragliding in India